The following are lists of candidates in the 2008 United States presidential election.  Candidates who are not on any state ballots, withdrew from the race, suspended their presidential campaign, or failed to earn their party's nomination are listed separately.

Party nominees
All candidates in the table below were on the ballot in multiple states.  Those who were on the ballot in enough states to win a majority in the U.S. Electoral College are marked in bold.  Candidates who were on the ballot in no more than one state are listed in the next section.

Ron Paul was on the ballot in Louisiana with Barry Goldwater, Jr. on the Louisiana Taxpayers Party ticket and in Montana with Michael Peroutka on the Constitution Party of Montana ticket, even though the latter is associated with the national Constitution Party. Paul's supporters also qualified him to receive write-in votes in California.  Paul was no longer actively running for president when he attained ballot status and asked to be removed. His request was denied by the Montana Secretary of State, because the request was sent to him too late.

Ballot access
The two major parties in the United States, the Democratic Party and the Republican Party, had ballot access in all 50 US states and the District of Columbia.

Each state sets its own requirements for candidates to gain ballot access. In some cases it is easier for party nominees to gain ballot access than for independent candidates, so Ralph Nader's independent campaign is associated with parties (pre-existing or newly formed) in some states: PF is the Peace and Freedom Party, NLP is the Natural Law Party, IEP is the Independent-Ecology Party, and IP is the Independent Party. In Kansas, Chuck Baldwin's campaign is associated with the Kansas Reform Party after a legal challenge had been brought to recognize national Reform Party candidate Ted Weill on the ballot.

George Phillies appeared on the ballot in New Hampshire with the label "Libertarian", with Chris Bennett as his running mate.

Candidates who had ballot access to enough electoral votes to win the presidency

Other third party candidates
Notes:
Since Socialist Workers party candidate Róger Calero was constitutionally disqualified to be President, in some states the Socialist Workers Party had James Harris (JH) listed on the ballot.

Other candidates
The tickets below were on the ballot in one state. Those without party labels are independents.  Some do not have vice-presidential candidates.
Jonathan Allen/Jeffrey Stath (Heartquake '08—Colorado, write-in in Arizona, Georgia, Montana, Ohio, and Texas)
Jeff Boss/Andrea Marie Psoras (Vote Here—New Jersey)
Richard Duncan/Ricky Johnson (Ohio)
Bradford Lyttle/Abraham Bassford (United States Pacifist Party—Colorado)
Frank McEnulty/David Mangan (Colorado)
John Joseph Polachek (New Party—Illinois)
Jeffrey Wamboldt (We the People Party—Wisconsin)
Ted Weill/Frank McEnulty (Reform—Mississippi)

Guam
Although Guam has no votes in the Electoral College, it has held a straw poll for its presidential preferences since 1980. In 2008, their ballot included Barr, McCain, and Obama. On July 10, 2008, the Guam legislature passed a law moving that poll forward to gain notoriety for Guam's election. The legislation was eventually vetoed.

Primary and convention candidates

Jared Ball (Green)
Joe Biden (Democratic)
Sam Brownback (Republican)
Eric Chester (Socialist)
Stephen Colbert (Democratic)
Hillary Clinton (Democratic)
Chris Dodd (Democratic)
Susan Gail Ducey (Constitution)
John Edwards (Democratic)
Mike Gravel (Democratic, Libertarian)
Rudy Giuliani (Republican)
Mike Huckabee (Republican)
Duncan Hunter (Republican)
Daniel Imperato (Constitution, Libertarian)
Mike Jingozian (Libertarian)
Jesse Johnson (Green)
Alan Keyes (Republican, Constitution)
Steve Kubby (Libertarian)
Dennis Kucinich (Democratic)
 Lee L. Mercer Jr. (Democratic)
 Kent Mesplay (Green)
Ralph Nader (Green)
Ron Paul (Republican)
George Phillies (Libertarian)
Bill Richardson (Democratic)
Max Riekse (Constitution)
Mitt Romney (Republican)
Wayne Allyn Root (Libertarian)
Mary Ruwart (Libertarian)
Christine Smith (Libertarian)
Kat Swift (Green)
Tom Tancredo (Republican)
Fred Thompson (Republican)
Tom Vilsack (Democratic)

Democratic Party primary ballot access

Republican Party primary ballot access
 and Republican Party comprehensive summary at

See also
List of candidates in the United States presidential election, 2004
Comparison of United States presidential candidates, 2008
Third party (United States) presidential candidates, 2008

References

External links
Ballot Access News
Politics1 - Ballot Access

2008-related lists
2000s politics-related lists
 
2008